Styphelia tubiflora, known as red five-corner is a shrub found in eastern Australia. The habitat is poor sandy soils, in dry eucalyptus forest or heathlands. It occurs in areas such as Sydney, Jervis Bay and the Blue Mountains.

It was first described by James Edward Smith in 1795.

Description

Oblong or obovate in shape, with a sharp tip and very short leaf stem. Flowering occurs between April and August. Occasionally the flowers are yellowish green or cream. The fruit is small and globular, containing five seeds.

References

tubiflora
Flora of New South Wales
Taxa named by James Edward Smith